WDEL-FM (101.7 MHz) is a commercial radio station licensed to serve Canton, New Jersey. It simulcasts the news/talk format of co-owned AM 1150 WDEL, based in Wilmington, Delaware. As of May 20, 2019 WDEL-AM-FM is owned and operated by the Forever Media. It was previously owned by Delmarva Broadcasting Company, a subsidiary of Steinman Enterprises, a family-owned newspaper, broadcasting and mining company, based in Lancaster, Pennsylvania.

The station's FM transmitter is located on Macanippuck Road in Greenwich Township.  But the signal extends from South Jersey into Northern Delaware, allowing listeners in the Wilmington area to hear WDEL's programming on FM as well as AM. Studios and offices are located on Shipley Road in Wilmington.

Programming and sports
WDEL-AM-FM airs local talk and information shows as well as nationally syndicated talk shows, including Dave Ramsey, Jim Bohannon, Red Eye Radio and America in the Morning. On weekends, WDEL-AM-FM airs shows devoted to money, sports, real estate, home repair, gardening and religion, including some paid brokered programming. Syndicated programming on weekends includes Clark Howard, Ric Edelman and Motley Fool. World and national news is supplied by CBS News Radio.

WDEL-AM-FM carries Philadelphia Phillies baseball, Philadelphia Eagles football, plus other local and national sports. WDEL-AM-FM airs Wesley College football and numerous New Castle County high school football and basketball games. On weekends, WDEL-AM-FM also carries some sports programming from the SportsMap Radio Network.

History
On January 15, 1972, the station signed on as WNNN.  It carried Christian programming, including preaching shows and religious music. By March 1989 the station had adopted the slogan of "Win 101.7."

QC Communications purchased the station on July 1, 1997, for $1.8 million.  It briefly adopted a middle of the road (MOR) music format.  On October 1, 1997, the station switched to urban adult contemporary music as "Kiss 101.7", using the call sign WJKS.  In December 2014, QC Communications announced it would sell WJKS to Delmarva Broadcasting.  As the license transfer was being completed, Delmarva began a local marketing agreement (LMA) to take over the running of WJKS, effective January 1, 2015.

On April 1, 2015, at 10:02PM, Delmarva flipped WJKS to a simulcast of 1150 WDEL. A call sign change to WDEL-FM took effect the next day.  (In the 1950s and 60s, the WDEL-FM call letters had been used on 93.7 WSTW, which is co-owned with WDEL-AM-FM.)

The sale to Delmarva Broadcasting was consummated on June 30, 2015, at a price of $3.25 million for WDEL-FM and sister station AM 1510 WFAI, which airs urban contemporary gospel music.

Forever Media bought Delmarva Broadcasting in early 2019 for $18.5-million. The deal closed on May 20, 2019.

See also
 WDEL (AM)

References

External links

Salem County, New Jersey
DEL-FM
News and talk radio stations in the United States
Radio stations established in 1972
1972 establishments in New Jersey